"Sky and Sand" is a song by German electronic music producers Paul Kalkbrenner and Fritz Kalkbrenner. The song was originally produced as the title song of the German movie Berlin Calling written and directed by Hannes Stöhr. It was first released on the Berlin Calling movie soundtrack album in October 2008 and in February 2009 as a single.

The song entered the charts in several European countries, and it was certified gold by the Federation of the Italian Music Industry. It reached number two in the Belgian Ultratop 50. In Germany it was the longest running chart song of all time spending 129 weeks inside the German singles charts and is still the longest running chart song of domestic origin. Only "Last Christmas" by Wham! (from the United Kingdom) lasted longer (140 weeks).

The song was used within a house party scene in The Lazerus Project (S1, E2).

Charts

Weekly charts

Year-end charts

References

English-language German songs
2009 songs